Peabody is an unincorporated community in Washington Township, Whitley County, in the U.S. state of Indiana.

History
Peabody was named after James Peabody, a local businessman.

A post office was established at Peabody in 1883, and remained in operation until it was discontinued in 1923.

Geography

References

Unincorporated communities in Whitley County, Indiana
Unincorporated communities in Indiana
Fort Wayne, IN Metropolitan Statistical Area